African Handball Championship may refer to:
 African Men's Handball Championship, men's tournament
 African Women's Handball Championship, women's tournament